Mitromorpha denizi is a species of sea snail, a marine gastropod mollusk that belongs to the family Mitromorphidae.

Description
The length of the shell varies between 6 mm and 8 mm.

Distribution
This species are often found in the Atlantic Ocean off the Western Sahara.

References

 Mifsud, C., 2001 The genus Mitromorpha Carpenter, 1865 and its subgenera with European species, p. 32 pp

External links
 
 

denizi
Gastropods described in 2001